Rosalie Cunningham (born 25 April 1990) is an English singer-songwriter. After the split of the band Ipso Facto, Cunningham started a new project named Purson. She has performed as a solo artist since 2017.

Career
Cunningham was born in Southend-on-Sea, started her first commercial band Ipso Facto in 2007, releasing the singles "Harmonise" / "Balderdash" (Disc Error) in October 2007,
"Ears And Eyes" (PureGroove) in August 2008,
"Six And Three Quarters" / "Circle Of Fifths" Mute Records in October 2008. These were followed by IF... a Vinyl Junkie release in February 2009. All their songs were written by Cunningham.

Ipso Facto broke up midway through 2009. Cunningham subsequently founded the psychedelic rock band Purson, with which she toured, composed and recorded for the next eight years. In April 2017 Purson also broke up. "I feel strongly drawn to a more DIY approach to my career in music, and look forward to the freedom to explore many avenues as a solo artist," Cunningham explained. Her debut solo album Rosalie Cunningham was released on 5 June 2019 by Esoteric Records, via Cherry Red.

Cunningham has also been working with other bands such as Magazine and The Last Shadow Puppets (though referred to as Rosie Cunningham) as a backing vocalist, appearing on stage with them on their recent tours, at the BBC Electric Proms and on Later... with Jools Holland.
She also played keyboards from January to May 2010 with These New Puritans on their tours of the album, Hidden.

In 2012, Cunningham played guitar with Willy Moon, as the support act for Jack White's UK tour.  She also contributed backing vocals to Cathedral's final album, The Last Spire, which was released in 2013.

On 25 February 2022 she released her second studio album Two Piece Puzzle.

Discography 
with Ipso Facto

Singles
Harmonise/Balderdash
Ears And Eyes
Six And Three-Quarters/Circle Of Fifths
IF...

with Purson

Albums
 2013: The Circle and the Blue Door (Rise Above/Metal Blade)
 2014: In the Meantime EP (Machine Elf Records), October 2014
 2016: Desire's Magic Theatre (Spinefarm Records), April 2016

Solo
Albums
 2019: Rosalie Cunningham (Cherry Red Records)
 2022: Two Piece Puzzle

References

External links
Ipso Facto MySpace

1990 births
Living people
English women singer-songwriters
English rock singers
English women pop singers
English keyboardists
English pop guitarists
People from Southend-on-Sea
21st-century English women singers
21st-century English singers